FC Stroitel Vitebsk was a Belarusian football club based in Vitebsk.

History
1989: founded as Kolos Ustye
1993: renamed to Kolos-Stroitel Ustye
1993: relocated to Vitebsk and renamed to Stroitel Vitebsk

FC Kolos Ustye was founded in 1989 in Ustye, Vitebsk Voblast, and until 1991 it was playing in Belarusian SSR league. Since 1992 Kolos started playing in Belarusian First League. In 1993 team's name was changed to Kolos-Stroitel, and in the summer of the same year the team was relocated to Vitebsk and renamed to Stroitel Vitebsk. After the end of 1994–95 season Stroitel was disbanded.

External links
Profile at footballfacts.ru

Association football clubs established in 1989
Association football clubs disestablished in 1995
Defunct football clubs in Belarus
1989 establishments in Belarus
1995 disestablishments in Belarus